A salt well (or brine well) is used to mine salt from caverns or deposits. Water is used as a solution to dissolve the salt or halite deposits so that they can be extracted by pipe to an evaporation process, which results in a brine or dry product for sale or use.  In the United States during the 19th century, salt wells were a significant source of income for operators and the government. Locating underground salt deposits was usually based on locations of existing salt springs.

In mountainous areas, a similar technique called sink works (from German sinkwerk) is used.

History
The Chinese have been using brine wells and a form of salt solution mining as part of their civilization for more than 2000 years. The first recorded salt well in China was dug in the Sichuan province around 2,250 years ago. This was the first time that ancient water well technology was applied successfully for the exploitation of salt, and marked the beginning of Sichuan’s salt drilling industry. Shaft wells were sunk as early as 220 BC in the Sichuan and Yunnan Provinces. By 1035 AD, Chinese in the Sichuan area were using percussion drilling to recover deep brines, a technique that would not be introduced to the West for another 600 to 800 years. Medieval and modern European travelers to China between 1400 to 1700 AD reported salt and natural gas production from dense networks of brine wells. Archaeological evidence of Song dynasty salt drilling tools used are kept and displayed in the Zigong Salt Industry Museum. Many of the wells were sunk deeper than 450 m and at least one well was more than 1000 meters deep. The medieval Venetian traveler to China, Marco Polo, reported an annual production in a single province of more than 30,000 tonnes of brine during his time there. According to Salt: A World History, a Qing Dynasty well, also in Zigong, "continued down to 3,300 feet (1,000 m) making it at the time the deepest drilled well in the world."

References

Chinese inventions
History of Sichuan
Mining techniques
Salt production